The Philippines competed at the 1988 Summer Olympics in Seoul, South Korea. 31 competitors, 26 men and 5 women, took part in 40 events in 11 sports.

Medalists

Competitors
The following is the list of number of competitors in the Games.

Archery

Men

Women

Athletics

Men

Track events

Women

Track Events

Boxing

Cycling

Three male cyclists represented the Philippines in 1988.

Road

Men

Track

Time Trial

Points races

Fencing

Judo

Rowing

Qualification Legend: R=Repechage

Sailing

Swimming

Men

Women

Weightlifting

Men's 54 kilograms
 Gregorio Colonia

Men's 56 kilograms
 Samuel Alegada

Men's 90 kilograms
 Ramon Solis

Wrestling

Men's Greco Roman (– 52 kg)
 Florentino Tirante

Men's Freestyle (– 52 kg)
 Florentino Tirante

Men's Freestyle (– 60 kg)
 Dean Manibog

Demonstration Sports

Bowling
Arianne Cerdeña won the gold medal.  Because bowling was a demonstration sport and not an official event, Cerdena's gold medal is not included in the medal tally.

Taekwondo
Men's Flyweight
 Stephen Fernandez

Men's Lightweight
 Monsour del Rosario

References

External links
Philippine Olympic Committee
Official Olympic Reports
International Olympic Committee results database

Nations at the 1988 Summer Olympics
1988
Summer Olympics